Chernobyl: Music from the Original TV Series is the soundtrack album to the historical drama miniseries Chernobyl, based on the aftermath of Chernobyl disaster that occurred during 1986. The musical score was composed by Icelandic composer Hildur Guðnadóttir, which was being created using sound recordings from an actual nuclear power plant. The score album featuring thirteen tracks, were released under Deutsche Grammophon and WaterTower Music labels on May 31, 2019. A vinyl edition of the soundtrack was released by Decca Records on September 6.

The score opened to positive reception, appreciating the soundscape, composition and live recording methods, where the authentic approach to capture "the sounds from nuclear plant" were highlighted and praised by critics. It was called as one of Guðnadóttir's best original score compositions followed by Joker's soundtrack, which released later this year. Guðnadóttir had received several awards and nominations for her work, including the Best Score Soundtrack for Visual Media at the 62nd Annual Grammy Awards.

Development 
In August 2018, during filming of the series, Guðnadóttir and score producer Chris Watson, went to the Ignalina Nuclear Power Plant in Lithuania (where the series being shot prominently) to record dark ambient sounds for the score. The music team wore hazmat suit for security reasons, on recording inside a nuclear plant. According to her, she wanted the power plant—and the radiation—to be a voice in itself, and had "wanted to understand the feeling of what must have gone through people’s heads as they were trying to navigate through that disaster", resulting in a sound of "creeping death".

Every single sound from the score, were made from the recordings they captured on site. Instead of artificially creating the sounds using instruments and pre-recorded material, Guðnadóttir wanted to "observe the setting", hoping to experience from a listener's perspective what it's like to actually be inside of a power plant. She explained the same in her podcast interview, saying "How does that sound? Like [what] does a catastrophe really feel like and how does it sound [...] We associate certain sounds of a nuclear disaster and those emitters, but there are so many other sounds that are there that were just so interesting to observe." She recorded the sounds of  reactor halls, hallways, turbine saws, the hums of machinery, walls and the engine room door, and started composition with the sounds she had collected, and also used reverbs and her own recordings, to make it actually sound like "singing in the rooms of the nuclear power plant and not in her music studio". Deciding against writing theme music for the series, Guðnadóttir created an individual soundscape for each episode. The composition eventually took more than seven months.

Reception 
Billboard's Ellen Emmerentze Jervell called it as "A simultaneously disturbing and melancholic soundtrack focused on sound-building rather than classic orchestration". Signing it as "smart and effective" soundtrack and "one of the best albums of 2019", Richie Corelli of Horror DNA wrote: "Hildur Guðnadóttir’s soundtrack is something that is sure to appeal to fans of horror music. The eeriness of the soundtrack, the anxiety-inducing push/pull between relaxing and restless, the bombastic builds, and the metallic timbres make this a tense, unnerving record." Filmmakers Academy analysed the score for the series, reviewing "this soundtrack is nothing short of a triumph of innovation, intellect, and ingenuity and its impact will likely last longer than any half-life". In contrast, Jonathan Broxton was more critical of the series' music, calling it as an "auditory nightmare".

Track listing 
All tracks and written and composed by Hildur Guðnadóttir, except where noted.

Accolades

References 

2019 soundtrack albums
Dark ambient soundtracks
Television soundtracks
Instrumental soundtracks
Deutsche Grammophon albums
Decca Records soundtracks
Hildur Guðnadóttir albums
WaterTower Music soundtracks
Grammy Award for Best Score Soundtrack for Visual Media